All Star Christmas Collection is a compilation album released by Warner Music Philippines on December 25, 2004. It is composed of 11 tracks and performed by Filipino singers under Warner Music Philippines such as Nina,  Artstrong, Paolo Santos, Kitchie Nadal, Pido, Christian Bautista, Thor, Dice & K9, Mike Luis, Side A Band and Joyce.

Track listing
 "The Christmas Song" – Nina
 "I Saw Mommy Kissing Santa Claus" - Artstrong
 "The Man Who Could Be Santa" – Paolo Santos
 "Merry Christmas Darling" – Kitchie Nadal
 "On Christmas Morning" - Pido
 "Silent Night" – Christian Bautista
 "This Christmas" – Thor
 "Last Christmas" – Dice & K9
 "Sleigh Ride" – Mike Luis
 "I'll Be Home For Christmas" – Side A Band
 "Have Yourself A Merry Little Christmas" - Joyce

References

2004 compilation albums
2004 Christmas albums
Christmas compilation albums
Christmas albums by Filipino artists